Insomnio is the fourth release by Spanish metal band Hamlet. It is the first nu metal-oriented album by Hamlet and the first album of this genre in Spain. The band claims Insomnio as their most important LP.

Track listing
 "Tortura-Visión"
 "Tu Medicina"
 "Dementes Cobardes"
 "Quién cree que Raquel se suicidó"
 "1998"
 "Antes y Después"
 "Muérdesela"
 "Dónde duermo hoy"
 "Mal"
 "Tan simple como decir no"
 "Lacabra"
 "Odio"

Personnel 
J. Molly – vocals
Luis Tárraga – lead guitar
Pedro Sánchez – rhythm guitar
Augusto Hernández – bass, chorus
Paco Sánchez – drums

Production
 Produced and mixed by Colin Richardson
 Recorded at the Chapel Studios, Lincolnshire, U.K.
 Mastered at The Exhange by Guy Davie, London U.K.

References

External links
Insomnio on discogs
Review of the album on Lafonoteca.net
Review of Insomnio on feiticeira.org

1998 albums
Hamlet (band) albums